Vinnikovo-Nikolayevka is a rural locality in Vinnikovsky Selsoviet Rural Settlement, Kursky District, Kursk Oblast, Russia. Population:

Geography 
The village is located on the Vinogrobl River (a left tributary of the Tuskar in the basin of the Seym), 114 km from the Russia–Ukraine border, 15 km north-east of the district center – the town Kursk, 1 km from the selsoviet center – 1st Vinnikovo.

 Climate
Vinnikovo-Nikolayevka has a warm-summer humid continental climate (Dfb in the Köppen climate classification).

Transport 
Vinnikovo-Nikolayevka is located 11 km from the federal route  (Kursk – Voronezh –  "Kaspy" Highway; a part of the European route ), 3.5 km from the road of regional importance  (Kursk – Kastornoye), on the road of intermunicipal significance  (1st Vinnikovo – Vodyanoye), 4 km from the nearest railway station Otreshkovo (railway line Kursk – 146 km).

The rural locality is situated 15 km from Kursk Vostochny Airport, 129 km from Belgorod International Airport and 188 km from Voronezh Peter the Great Airport.

References

Notes

Sources

Rural localities in Kursky District, Kursk Oblast